Strohfiddel may refer to:

Xylophone, based on the German term strohfiedel, referring to the straw bundles (stroh) which supported the keys.
Dulcigurdy, an instrument depicted in 17th century musical texts, often mislabeled as strohfiddel due to its proximity to a xylophone in a 1618 engraving in Syntagma Musicum.